Since July 2009, Israeli broadcast monitoring service Media Forest has been publishing four rankings which list the top ten most-broadcast Romanian and foreign songs on Romanian radio stations and television channels separately on a weekly basis. Nine radio stations—Europa FM, Info Pro, Kiss FM, Magic FM, National FM, Pro FM, Radio 21, Radio România Actualități and Radio ZU—and five television channels—1 Music Channel, Kiss TV, MTV Romania, Party TV and UTV Romania—were taken into consideration for the charts' compilation in 2009. They are based on the number of times tracks are broadcast, determined by acoustic fingerprinting.

Media Forest also releases year-end charts in regards to the radio airplay, listing the most-broadcast songs of Romanian origin of the respective year, weighted by the official audience numbers provided by Asociația pentru Radio Audiență (Romanian Association for Audience Numbers). David Deejay and Dony reached number one on the 2009 ranking with "So Bizarre". In 2009, eight and eleven singles were listed by Media Forest as the most-broadcast tracks on radio and television respectively. The first were "Takin' Back My Love" by Enrique Iglesias and Ciara (radio) and "Undeva-n Balcani" by Puya and George Hora (television) in July 2009. "I Gotta Feeling" by the Black Eyed Peas spent eight weeks as the most-broadcast single on radio stations, longer than any other, while in terms of television airplay, this feat was achieved by Edward Maya and Vika Jigulina's "Stereo Love" with a total of six non-consecutive weeks. "Chica Bomb" by Dan Balan was the final top song of 2009 on both listings.

Most-broadcast songs

Radio

Television

Notes

References

Romanian record charts
Number-one singles
Romania Singles
2000s (decade)